Nemastylis geminiflora, commonly known as prairie celestial, celestial, prairie pleatleaf, or celestial lily is a perennial herb in the Iridaceae (iris) family. It is native to the south-central area of the United States.

Description
Each stem is clasped by 1 to 4 narrow, linear leaves. Each flower lasts only one day, opening up in the late morning and closing mid-afternoon.

Distribution and habitat
The plant is native to Alabama, Arkansas, Kansas, Louisiana, Missouri, Mississippi, Oklahoma, Tennessee, and Texas. The plant occurs in limestone glades, prairies, and rocky slopes.

Ecology
N. geminiflora is pollinated by bees, flies, and other insects, which gather nectar from the flowers. Flowers appear in April and May.

References

Iridaceae
Flora of the United States
Plants described in 1835